Big CBS Spark was a youth entertainment channel which was a joint venture between Reliance Broadcast Network and CBS Studios International. It was shut down from June 2013.

In January 2014, CBS Studios International and Reliance Broadcast Network Ltd. ended their three-year joint venture. The joint venture was carrying three television channels for broadcast in India including Big CBS Prime, Big CBS Love and youth channel Big CBS Spark. Along with this JV dissolution between the two companies, Reliance started discontinuing CBS Spark from major cable operators in India including Reliance Digital TV, Den Networks, Airtel Digital TV, Dish TV, Videocon D2H and Hathway.

Shows broadcast
 Austin Powers: International Man of Mystery
 Spark Hitz
 Warbirds
 Hot Hitz
 The Jerry Springer Show
 Livewire
 America's Got Talent
 Spark's B Crunk'd
 Mojai Moja
 90210
 Weekend Special
 Spark Hitz Vdos
 Ggits
 Ultimate Top 50
 Cheaters

References

External links

Television stations in Mumbai
Television channels and stations disestablished in 2013
Former CBS Corporation subsidiaries
Year of establishment missing